Johann III may refer to:

 Johann III, Count of Sponheim-Starkenburg (c. 1315 – 1398)
 Johann III, Burgrave of Nuremberg (c. 1369 – 1420)
 Johann III, Duke of Cleves (1490–1538/9)
 Johann III Bernoulli (1744–1807)

See also
John III (disambiguation)